"Fly with Me" is a song recorded by English singer Mumzy Stranger. It was released as a single on 10 October 2010 by Tiffin Beats Records.

Composition and release
"Fly with Me" is the second single from Journey Begins. The single debuted at number 15 on the UK Asian Download Chart and stayed in the top 40 for more than 17 weeks but dropped off the chart at week 18. There are several remixes of "Fly with Me", a Grime Mix featuring Flo Dan, Gods Gift, KID & Roly; a Rishi Rich Kulcha Mix, a Bangla Mix featuring SH8S, a Cyantific Remix, a Dance Mix, a Young Archie Dance Mix, a Remix featuring VEE, an undergrime mix featuring Roly and a radio edit version.

References

External links

2010 songs
2010 singles
Mumzy Stranger songs